Kudzai Chimbaira (13 October 1985 – January 2018) was a Swedish-Zimbabwean actor and director.

She made her debut in 2005 in the short film Pamvura, and in 2007 she received an award at the Zimbabwe International Film Festival for best actress in a short film for playing the main character in the film The Return. The same year she also received a Zimbabwe's National Arts Merit Awards for her role in the play Anatol.

In 2008 she directed the play Silent Words for Harare International Festival of the Arts, and the same year she won an award for best actress in the Carthage Film Festival for her role in the film Zimbabwe. In 2008 she also moved to Sweden.

In Sweden she started the theater Integrationsteatern and was active in the Cinemafrica film festival, chairman of the diversity initiative Tryck, and acted in many plays, and the film Medan vi lever.

Chimbaira died in January 2018, 32 years old.

Sources 

1985 births
2018 deaths
21st-century Swedish actresses
Zimbabwean actresses
Zimbabwean directors
21st-century Zimbabwean actresses
Swedish directors
Swedish people of Zimbabwean descent